Arthur Langley (born Arthur Longbottom; 30 January 1933) is an English former footballer. An inside-forward, he scored 107 goals in 330 league appearances in an eleven-year career in the bottom two divisions of the Football League. He changed his surname from Longbottom to Langley after his retirement from football.

He spent 1954 to 1961 at Queens Park Rangers, before he was sold on to Port Vale in May 1961 for a £2,000 fee. He was sold on to Millwall for another £2,000 in January 1963, before joining Oxford United in the summer. He transferred to Colchester United in October 1964, and then moved into non-league football with Scarborough in May 1965. Though he never won any honours and was never promoted, he finished as top-scorer at QPR, Port Vale, and Oxford United.

Career
Longbottom signed for Jack Taylor's Queens Park Rangers from Methley United in 1954, and made his debut in a 3–0 defeat against Leyton Orient in March 1955. QPR finished 15th in the Third Division South in 1954–55. They then posted an 18th-place finish in 1955–56. Taking over Conway Smith's mantle as the club's key attacker, Longbottom finished as the club's top-scorer in 1956–57 with 15 goals, helping the club to a top ten finish. He scored 18 goals in 1957–58 to become the club's top-scorer once again; another tenth-place finish ensured Rangers a place in the restructured Third Division the following season. He hit 20 goals in 1958–59, becoming the club's top-scorer for a third consecutive season. New manager Alec Stock's new signing Brian Bedford then took over as the club's main source of goals, as QPR finished eighth in 1959–60, before finishing third in 1960–61 – missing out on promotion by just one place and two points. Longbottom played at inside-left, and scored 62 goals in 201 league appearances during his seven years at Loftus Road.

Longbottom transferred to Norman Low's Third Division Port Vale for a £2,000 fee in May 1961. He scored in his debut on 19 August, in a 4–2 defeat to Shrewsbury Town at Gay Meadow. He bagged 20 goals in 49 games in the 1961–62 season to become the club's joint-top-scorer (with Bert Llewellyn). He scored twice in 11 games in 1962–63, but new boss Freddie Steele sold him on to league rivals Millwall in January 1963 for a £2,000 fee. He scored one goal in ten league games for Ron Gray's "Lions", before leaving The Den in the summer.

He joined up with Fourth Division side Oxford United, and finished as the club's top-scorer in the 1963–64 season with 14 goals in 34 games. Having performed well in Arthur Turner's team, he earned a move away from the Manor Ground and back into the Third Division. Longbottom joined Colchester United in October 1964, and went on to score 13 goals in 36 appearances in 1964–65 – one goal less than top-scorer Billy Stark. The "U's" suffered relegation however, and manager Neil Franklin allowed Longbottom to leave Layer Road on a free transfer to Midland League club Scarborough in May 1965.

Post-retirement
Following the end of his football career he changed his surname by deed poll to Langley. He settled in Scarborough with wife, Jean. They have three children: Mark, Keith and Kirsty.

Career statistics
Source:

References

1933 births
Living people
Footballers from Leeds
English footballers
Association football forwards
Queens Park Rangers F.C. players
Port Vale F.C. players
Millwall F.C. players
Oxford United F.C. players
Colchester United F.C. players
Scarborough F.C. players
English Football League players
Midland Football League players